Crocus olivieri is a species of Crocus from Balkans, Albania, Yugoslavia and Bulgaria to Greece and Turkey.

The species is found growing in deciduous scrub and on open hillsides, or in pine woods from sea level to 1500 meters; flowering occurs in January till March.

Subspecies
Crocus olivieri subsp. olivieri – Balkan and Turkey
Crocus olivieri subsp. balansae (J.Gay ex Baker) B. Mathew – endemic round İzmir, West-Turkey. Typically the outside of the flowers are purplish and the styles are divided into twelve branches, unlike the species which has six.  
Crocus olivieri subsp. istanbulensis B. Mathew, Istanbul, Turkey.

References

External links
 
 

olivieri